Yarrapragada or Erranna  was a Telugu poet in the court of King Prolaya Vema Reddy (1325–1353). The surname of Erranna was Yerrapragada or Yerrana, which are epithets of the fair-skinned Lord Skanda in the Telugu language, but became attached to his paternal family due its having notable members with fair or red-skinned complexions. He was honoured with the title Prabandha-paramēśvara ("Master of historical anecdotes") and Śambhudāsuḍu ("Servant of Lord Śiva").

Birth and Ancestors
Errapragada Erranna was born in the village of Gudlur, located in Pakanadu (presently Prakasam district), and lived in Chadalawada, Prakasam district.  He belonged to the Śrīvatsa-gotra and Āpastamba-sūtra of the Niyogī Brahma-bandhu caste. His father was Errapragada Suranna and mother was Errapragada Potamma.  His grandfather was Errapragada Errapotanna whose name was given to him and his grandmother was Errapragada Peramma. His great-grandparents were Errapragada Bolanna and Errapragada Polamma and his great-great-grandfather was Errapragada Bhimanna.  His family followed the Smārta tradition of the Vedic religion. Although Erranna was a devotee of Lord Śiva, he also worshipped the Supreme Personality of Godhead.

Contributions
The Sanskrit Mahabharata was translated into Telugu over a period of several centuries (from the 11th to 14th centuries CE). Erranna was one of the kavitrayam ("Trinity of Poets") who rendered the Mahabharatam from Sanskrit into Telugu. The other two poets were Nannaya and Tikkana of the Andhra Mahabharatam ("Andhra Mahabharat"). Tikkana translated the remaining books starting from the 4th, leaving the third book titled the Aranya Parvamu ("Book of the Forest") half-finished, for Erranna to complete. Tikkana did not touch this part because it was considered to be inauspicious to translate this book, which was left half-finished by Nannaya. Erranna started the remaining half of the Aranya Parvamu with the style of Nannaya and ended it with the style of Tikkana as a bridge between the parts translated by Nannaya and Tikkana. Just like Nannaya and Tikkanna, he used half Sanskrit and half Telugu in his Telugu translation of the Sanskrit Mahabharata. He translated the Harivamsamu and Ramayanamu from Sanskrit, dedicating both works to the founder of the Reddy Dynasty, King Prolaya Vemareddy.

Nrusimhapuranamu was his own independent work. Erranna received his inspiration for the Nrusimhapuranam from his grandfather Errapotanna. According to tradition, one day when Erranna was meditating, his grandfather appeared and advised him to write the Narisimhapuranamu. This work was based on the Brahmandapuranamu and the Vishnupuranamu.

According to the Viṣṇu Purāṇa, King Hiraṇyakaśipu was the powerful demonic sovereign of the Earth millions of year ago at the beginning of the Yuga Cycle. The subjects of the Earth were described as Manavas ("descendants of Manu"; "humans"). The subjects of King Indra were described as Devatas. King Hiraṇyakaśipu fought a war with King Indra and, having emerged victorious, took over the heavenly planets. Under the rule of King Hiraṇyakaśipu, most of the Devatas either "converted to" or disguised themselves as Manavas for the fear of King Hiraṇyakaśipu. Another contemporary of King Hiraṇyakaśipu was also gate keeper of Śvetadvīpa, the Vaikuṇṭha planet in this universe, in a previous life, Śrī-hari who ruled in the Kṣīra-sāgara (the "Sea of Milk").

References

See also
 Reddy dynasty
 Telugu literature
 Kavitrayam

Telugu poets
Telugu writers
People from Prakasam district
Year of birth unknown
Year of death unknown
Poets from Andhra Pradesh
14th-century Indian poets
14th-century Indian translators
Sanskrit–Telugu translators